Latrodectus variolus, the northern black widow spider or northern widow, is a venomous species of spider in the genus Latrodectus of the family Theridiidae. The population is closely related to the southern black widow, Latrodectus mactans, and the western black widow, Latrodectus hesperus, of the genus.

In North America, the species is commonly found in Middle Atlantic states (New Jersey, Delaware, Maryland). During the April–May mating season, it can travel north along the coast as far as Massachusetts. It is also found in Connecticut in the late summer, and rarely, in southern Ontario and southern Quebec, Michigan, and at least as far northwest as parts of Wisconsin.

A bite may cause latrodectism, and requires medical attention in the case of increasingly severe discomfort or spreading local redness accompanied by severe pain.

Unlike for the related Latrodectus mactans,  no antivenom was available.

References

External links

variolus
Spiders of North America
Spiders described in 1837